Sandracottus jaechi, is a species of predaceous diving beetle found in Sri Lanka.

Description
Total body length is about 14.4 to 15.0 mm. Body oval, slightly broadened posteriorly behind the middle. Body blackish and shiny. Head with fine and sparse punctation with surface microreticulate. Pronotum with punctation and reticulation less impressed than on head. Elytra shiny with fine and sparse punctation with surface microreticulate. Ventrum blackish. The prosternai process is almost flat with more or less rounded apex. Outer margin of metasternal wings curved. Hind tibial spurs are bifid. In male, there are 13 sucker pallettes in protarsi. In male genitalia, the penis dorsoventrally flattened with equal parameres. Meanwhile, female has simple protarsi and mesotarsi.

References 

Dytiscidae
Insects of Sri Lanka
Insects described in 1985